Mary Helena Fortune (c. 1833 – 1911) was an Australian writer, under the pseudonyms "Waif Wander" and "W.W." She was one of the earliest female detective writers in the world, and probably the first to write from the viewpoint of the detective. Never financially secure, she wrote prolifically over several genres including poetry, detective, gothic horror, journalism and travel writing.

Personal life
She was born Mary Helena Wilson around 1833 in Belfast, Ireland. Her mother, Eleanor, née Atkinson, died when she was very young, so she travelled with her father, civil engineer George Wilson to Montreal, Canada. In Melbourne, Canada, she married Joseph Fortune on 25 March 1851 and they had one son. When her father left Canada for the Australian goldfields, she followed him after receiving an offer to write about the goldrush for the Ladies Companion. She left her husband behind and travelled to Australia with her son, arriving in Melbourne, Victoria, on 3 October 1855.

In November 1856, she gave birth to a second son, registered under the name of her husband, although there is no record of him ever entering Australia. She soon found it more financially rewarding to work for local newspapers, and several were pleased to publish her poetry, although The Mount Alexander Mail withdrew a job offer after realising she was female
In January 1858 her elder son died. On 25 October 1858, Mary married a Police constable, Percy Rollo Brett (possibly bigamously) at Dunolly, Victoria. It has  been surmised she may have obtained knowledge of police procedure and cases from him.

A prolific storyteller, she wrote in all over 500 detective stories over 40 years, most featuring Detective Mark Sinclair.

During her lifetime, she was popular enough to have a racehorse and greyhound named after her.

She became an alcoholic and was arrested several times for public drunkenness. The Australian Journal gave her an annuity when, her eyesight failing, she was unable to write. In 1910 she was in the "Benevolent Asylum" and she died in 1911. Her place of burial was unknown until 2016, when her grave was discovered at Springvale Cemetery. Her death passed without public notice, in part because she wrote under pseudonyms.

Her horror fiction story "The White Maniac: A Doctor's Tale" (included in James Doig's anthology Australian Ghost Stories (2010)) verges on being a tale of vampirism, but its theme is in fact anthropophagy.

The Detective's Album
She is best known for The Detective's Album, the longest-running early detective serial anywhere in the world. Narrated by detective Mark Sinclair, The Detective's Album was serialized for forty years in the Australian Journal from 1868 to 1908. In 1871, seven of the stories were published as a book, as The Detective's Album: Tales of the Australian Police.

In the early 1880s she collected her notes from the Goldfield days, and wrote a serial that was part memoir, part travelogue under the title Twenty-Six Years Ago; or, the Diggings from '55. It was later republished as a book, The Fortunes of Mary Fortune in 1989.

Selected works

Novels

 Bertha's Legacy (1866)
 Clyzia the Dwarf : A Romance (1866)
 The Secrets of Balbrooke : A Tale (1866)
 The Bushranger's Autobiography (1872)
 Dan Lyons' Doom (1884)
 Dora Carleton : A Tale of Australia (1886)

Short story collections

 The Detective's Album : Tales of the Australian Police (1871)
 The Fortunes of Mary Fortune (1996) edited by Lucy Sussex
 Three Murder Mysteries (2009)

Poetry collection

 Cooee and Other Poems (1995)

References

External links
 
Mary Fortune at the National Library of Australia

Examples of her work
 Wongaworra, Alexandra Times, 23 December 1876.
 Christmas Eve, Long Ago, At Braidwood, Portland Guardian, 25 December 1879.
 Monk's Mark, Burra Record, 28 April 1882.
 Ike's Sin: A Story of the Sea, Queanbeyan Age, 26 December 1884.
 The Detective's Dream, Portland Guardian, 24 December 1886.
 Three Jacks, Camperdown Chronicle, 3 November 1903.
 Noel or Love and War: Part 1 and Part 2, Camperdown Chronicle, 2 February 1904 and 9 February 1904.
 The Lilies of Forgiveness, Camperdown Chronicle, 26 April 1904.
 Coo-ee!, The Mail, 8 April 1916 (poem quoted in its entirety in a letter to the editor).
 
 "The White Maniac: A Doctor's Tale" Reprint of The Detectives Album edited by Lucy Sussex

1833 births
1911 deaths
Australian women poets
19th-century Australian journalists
Australian crime writers
Australian mystery writers
Women mystery writers
19th-century Australian women writers
20th-century Australian women writers
Pseudonymous women writers
19th-century pseudonymous writers